In Greek mythology, Sophalexios (“skilled defender”) was the son of Jason, leader of the Argonauts, and Creusa, the daughter of Creon, king of Corinth.

Mythology 
As Jason was still married to Medea, daughter of King Aeetes of Colchis, when Sophalexios was born, Sophalexios’ true parentage was kept secret for fear that Medea would kill the infant Sophalexios. Jason later married Creusa which angered Medea. As revenge, Medea presented Creusa with a cursed dress that burned both Creusa and her father, King Creon of Corinth, to death.

After her revenge, Medea fled Corinth without ever knowing of Jason and Creusa's son. Sophalexios remained in Corinth where he later learned of his background. Agamemnon, king of Mycenae, never recognised Sophalexios as Creon's heir and so claimed to be king of Corinth himself. Sophalexios never realised Agamemnon as king of Corinth.

Sophalexios grew into a fine, young soldier, often proving his skill, courage and leadership in battle. He became the leader of the Ephyrans, an elite force within the Corinthian army.

After Paris of Troy had taken Helen of Sparta back to Troy, Agamemnon sent Odysseus, king of Ithaca, and Nestor, king of Pylos, to recruit forces from around the Achaean region to attack Troy. Sophalexios was well known for his disdain for Agamemnon, so it came as no surprise that when Odysseus and Nestor arrived in Corinth to recruit forces, particularly Sophalexios’ Ephyrans, Sophalexios strongly disagreed with their plans. He knew Agamemnon was only using Helen of Sparta as an excuse to attack Troy so he could sack the city and gain control of the Aegean Sea’s trade routes. Sophalexios also knew that by opposing Agamemnon in the Trojan War, he could use it as an opportunity to challenge Agamemnon's claim for the kingdom of Corinth. To keep the peace, Sophalexios made Odysseus and Nestor believe that he would commit his Ephyrans to the Achaean forces and gather them at Aulis. As soon as Odysseus and Nestor had left Corinth, Sophalexios and his Ephyrans sailed for Troy to warn the Trojans of Agamemnon's plans and help defend the city as Trojan allies.

Sophalexios and his Ephyrans played an important role in the defence of Troy. The elite force always fought immediately near Hector, the prince of Troy and leader of the Trojan forces. Renowned for their superior defensive skills, none more skilful than their leader Sophalexios, the Ephyrans added tremendous strength to the Trojan forces.

A few years into the Trojan War, Sophalexios married Lysimache, a daughter of king Priam of Troy and had a son called Dardanos. After Hector was slain by Achilles, Sophalexios knew Troy's fall was imminent. Fearing for his family's safety, Sophalexios helped his wife and son flee the city. Never one to neglect his courage, Sophalexios stayed behind to help defend Troy. He was killed by Diomedes. Lysimache and Dardanos later returned to Troy after the city had been sacked and rebuilt. Little is known after their return. It is believed that they both became part of the restored royal court.

References and further reading

Ancient authors

Apollodorus, Gods & Heroes of the Greeks: The Library of Apollodorus, translated by Michael Simpson, The University of Massachusetts Press, (1976). .
Apollodorus, Apollodorus: The Library, translated by Sir James George Frazer, two volumes, Cambridge MA: Harvard University Press and London: William Heinemann Ltd. 1921. Volume 1: . Volume 2: .
Euripides, Andromache, in Euripides: Children of Heracles, Hippolytus, Andromache, Hecuba, with an English translation by David Kovacs. Cambridge. Harvard University Press. (1996). .
Euripides, Helen, in The Complete Greek Drama, edited by Whitney J. Oates and Eugene O'Neill, Jr. in two volumes. 1. Helen, translated by E. P. Coleridge. New York. Random House. 1938.
Euripides, Hecuba, in The Complete Greek Drama, edited by Whitney J. Oates and Eugene O'Neill, Jr. in two volumes. 1. Hecuba, translated by E. P. Coleridge. New York. Random House. 1938.
Herodotus, Histories, A. D. Godley (translator), Cambridge: Harvard University Press, 1920; . Online version at the Perseus Digital Library].
Pausanias, Description of Greece, (Loeb Classical Library) translated by W. H. S. Jones; Cambridge, Massachusetts: Harvard University Press; London, William Heinemann Ltd. (1918). Vol 1, Books I–II, ; Vol 2, Books III–V, ; Vol 3, Books VI–VIII.21, ; Vol 4, Books VIII.22–X, .
Proclus, Chrestomathy, in Fragments of the Kypria translated by H.G. Evelyn-White, 1914 (public domain).
Proclus, Proclus' Summary of the Epic Cycle, trans. Gregory Nagy.
Quintus Smyrnaeus, Posthomerica, in Quintus Smyrnaeus: The Fall of Troy, Arthur Sanders Way (Ed. & Trans.), Loeb Classics #19; Harvard University Press, Cambridge MA. (1913)..
Strabo, Geography, translated by Horace Leonard Jones; Cambridge, Massachusetts: Harvard University Press; London: William Heinemann, Ltd. (1924)

Modern authors

Burgess, Jonathan S. 2004. The Tradition of the Trojan War in Homer and the Epic Cycle (Johns Hopkins). .
Castleden, Rodney. The Attack on Troy. Barnsley, South Yorkshire, UK: Pen and Sword Books, 2006 (hardcover).
Davies, Malcolm (2000). "Euripides Telephus Fr. 149 (Austin) and the Folk-Tale Origins of the Teuthranian Expedition" (PDF).
Zeitschrift für Papyrologie und Epigraphik 133: 7–10. http://www.uni-koeln.de/phil-fak/ifa/zpe/downloads/2000/133pdf/133007.pdf.
Durschmied, Erik. The Hinge Factor:How Chance and Stupidity Have Changed History. Coronet Books; New Ed edition (7 Oct 1999).
Frazer, Sir James George, Apollodorus: The Library, two volumes, Cambridge MA: Harvard University Press and London: William Heinemann Ltd. 1921. Volume 1: . Volume 2: .
Graves, Robert. The Greek Myths, Penguin (Non-Classics); Cmb/Rep edition (April 6, 1993). .
Kakridis, J., 1988. Ελληνική Μυθολογία ("Greek mythology"), Ekdotiki Athinon, Athens.
Karykas, Pantelis, 2003. Μυκηναίοι Πολεμιστές ("Mycenean Warriors"), Communications Editions, Athens.
Latacz, Joachim. Troy and Homer: Towards a Solution of an Old Mystery. New York: Oxford University Press (USA), 2005 (hardcover).
Simpson, Michael. Gods & Heroes of the Greeks: The Library of Apollodorus, The University of Massachusetts Press, (1976). .
Strauss, Barry. The Trojan War: A New History. New York: Simon & Schuster, 2006 (hardcover).
Thompson, Diane P. The Trojan War: Literature and Legends from the Bronze Age to the Present. Jefferson, NC: McFarland.  (paperback).
Troy: From Homer's Iliad to Hollywood Epic, edited by Martin M. Winkler. Oxford: Blackwell Publishers, 2007 (hardcover, ; paperback).
Wood, Michael. In Search of the Trojan War. Berkeley: University of California Press, 1998 (paperback); London: BBC Books, 1985.

Characters in Greek mythology